The 2019 Murcian regional election was held on Sunday, 26 May 2019, to elect the 10th Regional Assembly of the autonomous community of the Region of Murcia. All 45 seats in the Regional Assembly were up for election. The election was held simultaneously with regional elections in eleven other autonomous communities and local elections all throughout Spain, as well as the 2019 European Parliament election.

Overview

Electoral system
The Regional Assembly of Murcia was the devolved, unicameral legislature of the autonomous community of Murcia, having legislative power in regional matters as defined by the Spanish Constitution and the Murcian Statute of Autonomy, as well as the ability to vote confidence in or withdraw it from a regional president.

Voting for the Regional Assembly was on the basis of universal suffrage, which comprised all nationals over 18 years of age, registered in the Region of Murcia and in full enjoyment of their political rights. Additionally, Murcians abroad were required to apply for voting before being permitted to vote, a system known as "begged" or expat vote. The 45 members of the Regional Assembly of Murcia were elected using the D'Hondt method and a closed list proportional representation, with an electoral threshold of three percent of valid votes—which included blank ballots—being applied regionally.

Election date
The term of the Regional Assembly of Murcia expired four years after the date of its previous election. Elections to the Regional Assembly were fixed for the fourth Sunday of May every four years. The previous election was held on 24 May 2015, setting the election date for the Regional Assembly on Sunday, 26 May 2019.

The president had the prerogative to dissolve the Regional Assembly of Murcia and call a snap election, provided that no motion of no confidence was in process, no nationwide election was due and some time requirements were met: namely, that dissolution did not occur either during the first legislative session or within the legislature's last year ahead of its scheduled expiry, nor before one year had elapsed since a previous dissolution under this procedure. In the event of an investiture process failing to elect a regional president within a two-month period from the first ballot, the Regional Assembly was to be automatically dissolved and a fresh election called. Any snap election held as a result of these circumstances would not alter the period to the next ordinary election, with elected deputies merely serving out what remained of their four-year terms.

Background
In the aftermath of the 2015 election, the People's Party (PP) and Citizens (Cs) signed a confidence and supply agreement which allowed Pedro Antonio Sánchez to be elected as new Murcian president. As part of the PP–Cs agreement, one of the newly elected Assembly's first initiatives was to increase the proportionality of the regional electoral system by scrapping the sub-provincial constituencies and lowering the required threshold from 5% to 3%.

A political crisis unveiled in the community after Pedro Antonio Sánchez was accused of several corruption offences on 20 February 2017. The scandal involved an ongoing judicial investigation on alleged irregularities in the process of awarding, construction and reception of an auditorium in Puerto Lumbreras, town from which Sánchez had been mayor between 2003 and 2013. While Sánchez had repeatedly assured he would resign right away if he was ever judicially charged for any crimes, he refused to do so after learning of his indictment despite Cs calls. Subsequently, Cs withdrew its parliamentary support, leaving the PP in minority, while threatening to support a censure motion on Sánchez promoted by the Spanish Socialist Workers' Party (PSOE) and Podemos. The PP accused Cs of breaking their agreement and of "playing with fire", with parties hinting at the possibility that a snap election could be eventually called by Sánchez in order to prevent his removal.

On 8 March, Cs gave Pedro Antonio Sánchez an ultimatum, demanding him to either tender his resignation or call a snap election before 27 March. Otherwise, Cs would support the PSOE censure motion to bring him down. On 3 April, the President of Murcia was accused by judge Eloy Velasco—from the National Audience—of participating in the case known as Trama Púnica (in Spanish), which led to his resignation as regional president on the following day and the withdrawal of the scheduled censure motion presented by the PSOE. During his farewell speech, Pedro Antonio Sánchez proposed Fernando López Miras as his successor.

Parliamentary composition
The Regional Assembly of Murcia was officially dissolved on 2 April 2019, after the publication of the dissolution decree in the Official Gazette of the Region of Murcia. The table below shows the composition of the parliamentary groups in the Regional Assembly at the time of dissolution.

Parties and candidates
The electoral law allowed for parties and federations registered in the interior ministry, coalitions and groupings of electors to present lists of candidates. Parties and federations intending to form a coalition ahead of an election were required to inform the relevant Electoral Commission within ten days of the election call, whereas groupings of electors needed to secure the signature of at least one percent of the electorate in the Region of Murcia, disallowing electors from signing for more than one list of candidates.

Below is a list of the main parties and electoral alliances which contested the election:

Opinion polls
The table below lists voting intention estimates in reverse chronological order, showing the most recent first and using the dates when the survey fieldwork was done, as opposed to the date of publication. Where the fieldwork dates are unknown, the date of publication is given instead. The highest percentage figure in each polling survey is displayed with its background shaded in the leading party's colour. If a tie ensues, this is applied to the figures with the highest percentages. The "Lead" column on the right shows the percentage-point difference between the parties with the highest percentages in a poll. When available, seat projections determined by the polling organisations are displayed below (or in place of) the percentages in a smaller font; 23 seats were required for an absolute majority in the Regional Assembly of Murcia.

Results

Aftermath

Government formation

2021 motion of no-confidence

Notes

References
Opinion poll sources

Other

2019 in Murcia (region)
Murcia
Regional elections in the Region of Murcia
May 2019 events in Spain